Dauber may refer to:

People 
 Jeremy Dauber, Yiddish literature scholar
 Michele Dauber, American academic
 William Dauber (1935–1980), Chicago mobster

Other uses 
 Dauber (horse), an American racehorse, won 1938 Preakness Stakes
 Mud dauber, the common name for several kinds of wasps

See also 
 Tauber (surname)
 Daub (disambiguation)

Low German surnames
Occupational surnames